Kamranieh (also spelled Kamraniyeh) (also Romanized as kāmrānīyeh) is an affluent and luxury neighbourhood located in one of the northernmost parts of Greater Tehran in the area called Shemiran, on the slopes of Alborz mountain range. Kamranieh is known for its luxurious high-rise buildings, costly apartments and massive mansions. Centered on Kamranieh street, the neighborhood lies within Shemiranat County and district one of Tehran municipality.

Along with Farmanieh, Niavaran, Zafaraniyeh and Elahieh, it is now home to the most expensive real estate in Tehran. It is also the home to many Iranian nobles and notables as well as embassies and foreign officials.

The name  of Kamranieh is based on the son of Naser-al-din Shah, Kamran Mirza Nayeb es-Saltaneh, who used to own much of the land in the area. Kamranieh was one of the first neighbourhoods in Tehran that was equipped with a telephone system.
In addition, the first pet hospital of Iran, Tehran Pet hospital, was established in this neighbourhood in 2004.

History 

In the late 1800s, Kamran Mirza Nayeb es-Saltaneh, the eldest son of Naser al-Din Shah Qajar, grabbed the lands of Kamranieh from the locals who used to farm in the area. Afterwards, he ordered to build a fabulous garden instead of the farmlands and then named it Kamranieh which means the estate belongs to Kamran. Kamranieh garden featured a large variety of plants and a greenhouse to protect sensitive flowers inside it in winter. In audition, two Austrian gardeners were hired to protect the garden all the time.

After Kamran Mirza's death in 1929, his children gradually sold the lands of Kamranieh garden to wealthy residents of Tehran. The new owners built themselves villas in order to use them as summer houses. Today however most of the gardens have been replaced by residential towers and newbuild apartments, few of them have actually escaped development.

Location 
Kamranieh touches Niavaran on the north, Sadr Expressway on the south and Farmanieh on the east and west. Kamranieh has two segments named South Kamranieh and North Kamranieh. South Kamranieh is below Kamranieh junction and North Kamranieh is located upon the junction. Kamranieh junction is the point where Kamranieh street, Farmanieh street and Andarzgoo Boulevard join each other.

Weather 
Kamranieh lies on the slopes of Alborz Mountains and enjoys a suitable mild climate.

Notable Sights 
 Organisation for Economic Co-operation and Development
 Tehran Pet Hospital
 Embassy of Venezuela in Tehran
 Embassy of Libya in Tehran 
 Embassy of Slovenia in Tehran
 The residence of Czech Republic in Tehran

Notable residents 
 The private residence of Kamran Diba, designer of Tehran Museum of Contemporary Art (TMOCA), is also in Kamranieh.  Same as TMOCA, its architecture is similar to Yazd windcatchers (badgir).
 Shahpour Bakhtiar, the last Prime Minister of Iran under the Mohammad Reza Shah Pahlavi

Gallery

See also 
 Farmanieh
 Niavaran
 Shemiran

External links
Kamranieh Magazine

Neighbourhoods in Tehran